M-learning or mobile learning is "learning across multiple contexts, through social and content interactions, using personal electronic devices". A form of distance education, m-learners use mobile device educational technology at their convenience time.

M-learning technologies include handheld computers, MP3 players, notebooks, mobile phones, and tablets. M-learning focuses on the mobility of the learner, interacting with portable technologies. Using mobile tools for creating learning aids and materials becomes an important part of informal learning.

M-learning is convenient in that it is accessible virtually anywhere. Sharing is almost instantaneous among everyone using the same content, which leads to the reception of instant feedback and tips. M-learning also brings strong portability by replacing books and notes with small devices filled with tailored learning contents. M-learning has the added benefit of being cost-effective, as the price of digital content on tablets is falling sharply compared to traditional media (books, CDs, DVDs, etc.). One digital textbook, for instance, costs one-third to half the price of a paper textbook (AFD, 2012), with zero marginal cost.

According to Fombona, Pascual-Sevillana, and González-Videgaray, this methodology offers some possibilities, such as greater and different access to information. It also offers transcendent innovations, such as the increase of informal and playful activities, iconic virtual membership, and networks of friendly interaction within new scales of values.

Background
Mobile learning is the delivery of learning, education, or learning support on mobile phones, PDAs, or tablets. New mobile technology, such as hand-held-based devices, is playing a large role in redefining how people receive information.

History of M-learning 
Concepts of m-learning was given by Alan Kay in the 1970s. He joined Xerox Corporation's Palo Alto Research Center and formed a group to develop "Dynabook", which is a portable and hands-on personal computer. It aimed to let children have access to the digital world. This project failed eventually due to the lack of technological support at that time. Until 1994, the first smartphone, IBM Simon, was created by Mitsubishi Electric Corp. It was defined as a handheld personal communicator. From then on, technological companies started to design the so-called "smartphones". The creation of the smartphone provided the platform for mobile learning, and the current mobile device innovation pushed mobile learning to project and research status.

Chronologically, m-learning research has been characterized into three phases: the first phase is the focus on devices; the second is the focus on learning outside the classroom; the third phase is the focus on the mobility of the learner. In its second phase, around 2005, a tremendous number of projects have been completed, four major projects are "The Leonardo da Vinci project From e-learning to m-learning led by Ericsson Education Dublin", "The Leonardo da Vinci project Mobile learning: the next generation of learning led by Ericsson Education Dublin", "The IST project M-Learning led by the United Kingdom government Learning and Skills Development Agency (LSDA)" and "The IST project MOBILearn led by Giunti Ricerca of Genoa, Italy". These projects are mainly targeted on the effects of m-learning, like motivation to learn, engagement in learning activities, and focus on special needs people; they set the tone for mobile learning, and m-learning is prepared to transfer from project status to mainstream education and training.

And M-learning research is globalized now: Africa, Asia, North America, Europe, Scandinavia, Australia, and New Zealand all have remarkable achievements in this field.

Approaches

Classroom

Applications in classrooms and other learning spaces combine the use of handheld computers, PDAs, smartphones, or handheld voting systems (such as clickers) with traditional resources .
 Class management

Mobile devices in brick-and-mortar classrooms can be used to enhance student-centered learning, group collaboration among students through communication applications, interactive displays, quick response codes, and video features.
Existing mobile technology can replace cumbersome resources such as textbooks, visual aids, and presentation technology. 
Interactive and multi-mode technology allows students to engage and manipulate information.
Mobile Device features with WIFI capabilities allow for on-demand access to information.
Access to classroom activities and information on mobile devices provides a continuum for learning inside and outside the classroom.

In a literature review conducted by FutureLab, researchers found that increased communication, collaboration, and understanding of concepts were a result of mobile technology applications.

 Distance Learning

Mobile devices can be used in online settings to enhance learning experiences.
The mobile phone (through text SMS notices) can be used especially for distance education or with students whose courses require them to be highly mobile and in particular to communicate information regarding the availability of assignment results, venue changes, and cancellations, etc.
Mobile devices facilitate online interaction between teacher and student, and student to student. Mobile devices make it possible to facilitate interaction in real-time, allowing students to obtain immediate feedback. Educators can also assess student comprehension by using mobile devices, which provide real-time updates on student progress, enabling teachers to adapt and personalize their teaching.
It can also be of value to business people, e.g. sales representatives who do not wish to waste time away from their busy schedules to attend formal training events.

 Podcasting

Podcasting consists of listening to audio recordings of lectures. It can be used to review live lectures  and to provide opportunities for students to rehearse oral presentations.
Podcasts may also provide supplemental information to enhance traditional lectures  .

Psychological research suggests that university students who download podcast lectures achieve substantially higher exam results than those who attend the lecture in person (only in cases in which students take notes) .

Podcasts may be delivered using syndication, although this method of delivery is not always easily adopted .

Work
M-learning in the context of work can embrace a variety of different forms of learning. It has been defined as the "processes of coming to know, and of being able to operate successfully in, and across, new and ever-changing contexts, including learning for, at and through work, by utilizing mobile devices".

M-learning for work
M-learning at and through work
Cross-contextual m-learning

Learning for work, which could be also described as 'just-in-case' learning, involves classic and formal education activities, such as training courses, that prepare learners for future work-related tasks. A typical, corporate application is the delivery of mobile compliance training, which can be seen as a viable means to reach geographically mobile employees, such as consultants or staff in logistic and transport systems. Another application is mobile simulations that prepare learners for future situations, for example, real-time SMS-based simulations for disaster response training.

Learning at and through work, which could be labeled as "just-in-time" mobile learning, occurs in informal education settings at the workplace. Employees can use the mobile phone to solve problems via handheld devices in situ, for example by accessing informational resources (such as checklists and reference guides) before customer visits or mobile decision support systems. The latter is popular in clinical settings where they support highly mobile medical staff through rule-based algorithms in the decision regarding more complex patient cases. Their application was associated with learning and in particular with practice improvement of medical staff. Learning through work also occurs by interacting with distant peers via phone. "People tagging" is an approach whereby people assign topics they associate with co-workers. The aggregation of interests and experiences serves not only as a means to raise awareness but also to help find competent experts on demand, for example with context-sensitive expert location systems.

Cross-contextual learning that bridges the gap between work settings and formal education formats has perhaps the biggest potential for work-based mobile learning, especially for tertiary education systems. This involves approaches in which learning in the workplace is facilitated and substantiated (for example through formative assessments, reflective questions, or the documentation of personal achievements in multimedia learning diaries or portfolios) The so-created materials are later used in more formal educational formats, for example in the classroom or the discussion with tutors. The value of these mobile phone-mediated learning practices lies in the integration and reconciliation of work-based learning and formal education experiences which otherwise tend to remain separated.

Lifelong learning and self-learning
Mobile technologies and approaches, i.e. mobile-assisted language learning (MALL), are also used to assist in language learning. For instance handheld computers, cell phones, and podcasting  have been used to help people acquire and develop language skills.

Other
 Improving levels of literacy, numeracy, and participation in education amongst young adults.
 Using the communication features of a mobile phone as part of a larger learning activity, e.g.: sending media or texts into a central portfolio, or exporting audio files from a learning platform to your phone.
 Developing workforce skills and readiness among youth and young adults.

Mobile learning for refugees 

Refugees are confronted several individual challenges that can negatively impact their learning and teaching opportunities, as well as their lives beyond the learning environment. Mobile solutions play a key role in enhancing refugees’ informal learning. Technology provides support for refugees' informal learning in the following challenges:

 Lack of language and literacy skills in host countries;
 Trauma and identity struggles;
 Disorientation in new environments;
 Exclusion and isolation.

Around the world

Spain 
The mSchools programme is a comprehensive mobile education initiative led by a public–private partnership between the Generalitat de Catalunya (Government of Catalonia), Barcelona City Hall and the GSMA. The objective of mSchools is to empower students and teachers to integrate mobile technologies into the classroom, opening up new ways of teaching and learning that improve learner engagement, achievement and employability. mSchools develops curricular materials, tools and methodologies designed to help teachers to change their pedagogy and methodology, and students to become lifelong learners. It has a special focus on digital competencies, advocacy for career paths in science, technology, engineering and maths (STEM), and fostering gender equality (UNESCO, 2013). The mSchools programme brings together private and public institutions to help students build paramount new skills and prepare them for today’s digital world. The mSchools programme comprises many initiatives, including online platforms, curricular materials, events, challenges and methodologies.

Finland 
The Finnish National Core Curriculum for Basic Education was renewed in 2014. Considering the increasing significance of technology as both an objective and a means of learning, ICT and mobile learning were integrated into the new National Core Curriculum as a transversal competence that is present in all learning and teaching.

PaikkaOppi (which roughly means ’learning of places’) is a Finnish educational innovation supporting open science and the information society. It is an open web-based learning environment for Geographic Information System (GIS) usage in schools. Moreover, it is a potential spearhead in national policy for the development of skills and education by integrating disciplines and promoting the use of mobile learning. Students are able to view, analyze and share their data collaboratively or individually with browser-based map applications. Mobile applications for Android and iOS devices are for saving personal data in the field trips or at home. Being accessible to all users free of charge, PaikkaOppi is very widely used at schools, home and on free time as well. The service supports teaching the core curricula: competences for spatial citizenship, multi-literacy skills, logical thinking, and problem solving skills. The service is being used all over the country as a project platform for several school subjects and multidisciplinary learning modules from primary schools to upper secondary.

Pakistan 
In Pakistan, the Rehan School was one of the first initiatives to offer remote courses that could be accessed from a basic mobile phone. The application offers short educational sequences, showing how to write common names and words and conveying mathematical and scientific concepts. Sometimes featuring television personalities, the teaching sketches are intended for viewing on small telephone screens. The films are sold for a few cents in the telecoms boutiques and can then be exchanged by Bluetooth. The Rehan School estimates that over 40,000 individuals follow its lessons, but the real number is certainly higher.

Papua New Guinea 
In Papua New Guinea, the SMS Story project has improved teachers' classroom practices in teaching children to read by using short messages and sent by SMS.

Sub-Saharan Africa 
Since the 1960s, various information and communication technologies have aroused strong interest in Sub-Saharan Africa as a way of increasing access to education, and enhancing its quality and fairness. In Sub-Saharan Africa, teachers and students are faced with an extreme shortage of teaching materials. The number of textbooks available are limited, so few students have individual access to textbooks in class or at home. Given the shortage of textbooks in many African schools, tablets and mobile phones are being viewed by governments and international organizations as a solution to provide access to learning materials. In one example, the Tangerine mobile assessment and coaching system, deployed in Kenya, aims to help teachers in their assessment activities. With Tangerine, a student's reading level can be evaluated by recording the student's answers on a mobile phone or a tablet. The data gathered by the application also allows comparisons of the learning levels of students according to their age, geographical area and gender.

Analysis

Effectiveness
A recent study on health professions education combined evidence from 29 studies, which included 3175 learners, and concluded that mLearning is as effective as traditional learning in terms of improving learners' knowledge and skill. The study highlights that mLearning is a novel educational strategy that is rapidly developing in the field of health professions education, "21 of the 29 included studies (72%) published between 2014 and 2017, it’s clear that mLearning is an emerging educational strategy. The remaining 8 studies were published between 2006 and 2013, with no studies published before 2006, further highlighting the modern nature of this approach to health professions education and its relevance"

Value
The value of mobile learning
Tutors who have used m-learning programs and techniques have made the following value statements in favor of m-learning.

It is important to bring new technology into the classroom.
The devices used are more lightweight than books and PCs.
Mobile learning can be used to diversify the types of learning activities students partake in (or a blended learning approach).
Mobile learning supports the learning process rather than being integral to it.
Mobile learning can be a useful add-on tool for students with special needs. However, for SMS and MMS, this might be dependent on the student's specific disabilities or difficulties involved.
Mobile learning can be used as a ‘hook’ to re-engage disaffected youth.
M-Learning can be designed to combine decision-making in complex learning scenarios with formative scoring and assessment.
Mobile Learning courses can be accessed either online or offline.

Benefits

Relatively inexpensive opportunities, as the cost of mobile devices, are significantly less than PCs and laptops
Multimedia content delivery and creation options 
Continuous and situated learning support 
Decrease in training costs 
Potentially a more rewarding learning experience
New opportunities for traditional educational institutions
Readily available a/synchronous learning experience
Decrease in textbook costs
Access to personalized content
Remote access to knowledge
Improved literacy levels

Characterization 
Characterization of M-learning

 It can get access to information and educational experience faster than other media.
 It is supported by portable devices, its mobility makes it easy to use.
 Compared to other methods of learning, the cost of M-learning is relatively low.
 The exchange of information can be encrypted or private.
 It is easy to access all kinds of information.

Aspects 

Aspects of M-learning

Along with the development of m-learning, many theories about mobile educations are raised by researchers, major aspects are listed.

 Mobile learning uses mobile technology and is portable.
 Mobile learning is a continuation and extension of e-learning.
 Mobile learning is learner-centered, "The learner plays an active role from determination of the goals until the evaluation stage"

Challenges
Technical challenges
 Internet connectivity and battery life
 Screen size and key size
 Meeting required bandwidth for nonstop/fast streaming
 Number of file/asset formats supported by a specific device
 Content security or copyright issue from authoring group
 Multiple standards, multiple screen sizes, multiple operating systems
 Reworking existing E-Learning materials for mobile platforms
 Limited memory 
 Risk of sudden obsolescence
Security
Work/life balance
Cost of investment

Social and educational challenges
 Accessibility and cost barriers for end users: digital divide.
 How to assess learning outside the classroom
 How to support learning across many contexts
 Content's security or copyright infringement issues
 Frequent changes in device models/technologies/functionality etc.
 Developing an appropriate theory of learning for the mobile age
 Conceptual differences between e-learning and m-learning
 Design of technology to support a lifetime of learning
 Tracking of results and proper use of this information
 No restriction on learning timetable
 Personal and private information and content
 No demographic boundary
 Disruption of students' personal and academic lives
 Access to and use of the technology in developing countries
 Risk of distraction
 Mobile usage habits among different countries and regions

Growth
Mobile learning is widely used in schools, workplaces, museums, cities and rural areas around the world. In comparison to traditional classroom pedagogical approaches, mobile learning allows widened opportunities for timing, location, accessibility and context of learning.

Current areas of growth include:

 Testing, surveys, job aids and just-in-time (J.I.T.) learning
 Location-based and contextual learning
 Social-networked mobile learning
 Mobile educational gaming
 Delivering m-Learning to cellular phones using two way SMS messaging and voice-based CellCasting (podcasting to phones with interactive assessments)
 Cloud computer file storage

See also

Sources

References

Alternative education
Computing and society
Educational technology
Distance education
Simulation
Mobile technology
E-learning